Hassan Taxi is a 1982 Algerian Arabic-language comedy film directed by Mohamed Slim Riad.

Cast 

 Rouiched as Hassan Terro
 Robert Cestel
 Fatiha Berber
 Mustapha Chougrani
 Lucette Sahuquet
 Seloua

Synopsis 
Hassan Terro (Rouiched) who is exhausted and worn out by the long years of post-independence gets a taxi license as a former fighter travelling through the streets of Algiers, the capital of Algeria and experiences the most incredible adventures in humorous sense.

References

External links 

 
 allmmovie.com
 

1982 films
1982 comedy films
1980s Arabic-language films
Algerian comedy films